

Events

Pre-1600
1185 – The Uprising of Asen and Peter begins on the feast day of St. Demetrius of Thessaloniki and ends with the creation of the Second Bulgarian Empire.
1341 – The Byzantine civil war of 1341–1347 formally begins with the proclamation of John VI Kantakouzenos as Byzantine Emperor.
1377 – Tvrtko I is crowned the first king of Bosnia.
1520 – Charles V is crowned as Holy Roman Emperor.
1597 – Imjin War: Korean Admiral Yi Sun-sin routs the Japanese Navy of 300 ships with only 13 ships at the Battle of Myeongnyang.

1601–1900
1640 – The Treaty of Ripon is signed, restoring peace between Covenanter Scotland and King Charles I of England.
1689 – General Enea Silvio Piccolomini of Austria burns down Skopje to prevent the spread of cholera; he dies of the disease soon afterwards.
1774 – American Revolution: The First Continental Congress adjourns in Philadelphia.
1813 – War of 1812: A combined force of British regulars, Canadian militia and Mohawks defeat the United States Army in the Battle of the Chateauguay.
1825 – The Erie Canal opens, allowing direct passage from the Hudson River to Lake Erie.
1859 – The Royal Charter Storm kills at least eight hundred people in the British Isles.
1860 – Unification of Italy: The Expedition of the Thousand ends when Giuseppe Garibaldi presents his conquests to King Victor Emmanuel of Sardinia.
1863 – The Football Association is founded.
1871 – Liberian President Edward James Roye is deposed in a coup d'état.
1881 – Wyatt Earp and Doc Holliday participate in the Gunfight at the O.K. Corral in Tombstone, Arizona.
1890 – Malleco Viaduct in Chile, at the time "the highest railroad bridge in the world", is inaugurated by President José Manuel Balmaceda.
1892 – Ida B. Wells publishes Southern Horrors: Lynch Law in All Its Phases.

1901–present
1905 – King Oscar II recognizes the dissolution of the union between Norway and Sweden.
1909 – Japanese occupation of Korea: An Jung-geun assassinates Japan's Resident-General of Korea.
1912 – First Balkan War: The Ottomans lose the cities of Thessaloniki and Skopje.
1917 – World War I: Brazil declares war on the Central Powers.
1918 – World War I: Erich Ludendorff, quartermaster-general of the Imperial German Army, is dismissed by Kaiser Wilhelm II for refusing to cooperate in peace negotiations.
1936 – The first electric generator at Hoover Dam goes into full operation.
1937 – Nazi Germany begins expulsions of 18,000 Polish Jews.
1942 – World War II: In the Battle of the Santa Cruz Islands during the Guadalcanal Campaign, one U.S. aircraft carrier is sunk and another carrier is heavily damaged, while two Japanese carriers and one cruiser are heavily damaged.
1944 – World War II: The Battle of Leyte Gulf ends with an overwhelming American victory.
1947 – Partition of India: The Maharaja of Kashmir and Jammu signs the Instrument of Accession with India, beginning the Indo-Pakistani War of 1947–1948 and the Kashmir conflict. 
1955 – After the last Allied troops have left the country, and following the provisions of the Austrian Independence Treaty, Austria declares that it will never join a military alliance.
  1955   – Ngô Đình Diệm proclaims himself as President of the newly created Republic of Vietnam.
1956 – Hungarian Revolution: In the towns of Mosonmagyaróvár and Esztergom, Hungarian secret police forces massacre civilians. As rebel strongholds in Budapest hold, fighting spreads throughout the country.  
1958 – Pan American Airways makes the first commercial flight of the Boeing 707 from New York City to Paris.
1967 – Mohammad Reza Pahlavi crowns himself Emperor of Iran.
1968 – Space Race: The Soyuz 3 mission achieves the first Soviet space rendezvous.
1977 – Ali Maow Maalin, the last natural case of smallpox, develops a rash in Somalia. The World Health Organization and the Centers for Disease Control and Prevention consider this date to be the anniversary of the eradication of smallpox, the most spectacular success of vaccination.
1979 – Park Chung-hee, President of South Korea, is assassinated by Korean CIA head Kim Jae-gyu.
1985 – The Australian government returns ownership of Uluru to the local Pitjantjatjara Aboriginals.
1989 – China Airlines Flight 204 crashes after takeoff from Hualien Airport in Taiwan, killing all 54 people on board.
1991 – Three months after the end of the Ten-Day War, the last soldier of the Yugoslav People's Army leaves the territory of the Republic of Slovenia.
1994 – Jordan and Israel sign a peace treaty.
1995 – Mossad agents assassinate Palestinian Islamic Jihad leader Fathi Shaqaqi in his hotel in Malta.
  1995   – An avalanche hits the Icelandic village of Flateyri, destroying 29 homes and burying 45 people, and killing 20.
1999 – The United Kingdom's House of Lords votes to end the right of most hereditary peers to vote in Britain's upper chamber of Parliament.
2000 – A wave of protests forces Robert Guéï to step down as president after the Ivorian presidential election.
2001 – The United States passes the USA PATRIOT Act into law.
2002 – Approximately 50 Chechen terrorists and 150 hostages die when Russian special forces troops storm a theater building in Moscow, which had been occupied by the terrorists during a musical performance three days before.
2003 – The Cedar Fire, the third-largest wildfire in California history, kills 15 people, consumes , and destroys 2,200 homes around San Diego.
2004 – Rockstar Games releases Grand Theft Auto: San Andreas for the PlayStation 2 in North America, which sold 12 million units for the PS2, becoming the console's best-selling video game.
2012 – Microsoft made a public release of Windows 8 and made available it on new PCs.
2015 – A 7.5 magnitude earthquake strikes in the Hindu Kush mountain range in South Asia, killing 399 people and leaving 2,536 people injured.
2017 – At a level crossing of the Hanko–Hyvinkää railway line, a passenger train collides with an off-road truck of the Nyland Brigade in Raseborg, Finland; four people die and 11 are injured.

Births

Pre-1600
1416 – Edmund Grey, 1st Earl of Kent, English politician, Lord High Treasurer (d. 1490)
1427 – Sigismund, Archduke of Austria (d. 1496)
1431 – Ercole I d'Este, Duke of Ferrara, Italian politician (d. 1505)
1473 – Friedrich of Saxony, Grand Master of the Teutonic Knights (d. 1510)
1483 – Hans Buchner, German Renaissance composer (d. 1538)
1491 – Zhengde Emperor of China (d. 1521)
1518 – John Basset, Devonshire gentleman (d. 1541)
1529 – Anna of Hesse, princess of Hesse (d. 1591)
1551 – Charlotte de Sauve, French courtesan (d. 1617)
1556 – Ahmad Baba al Massufi, Malian academic (d. 1627)
1564 – Hans Leo Hassler, German organist and composer (d. 1612)

1601–1900
1609 – William Sprague, English-American settler, co-founded Charlestown, Massachusetts (d. 1675)
1612 – Henry Wilmot, 1st Earl of Rochester (d. 1658)
1673 – Dimitrie Cantemir, Moldavian geographer, historian, and philosopher (d. 1723)
1684 – Kurt Christoph Graf von Schwerin, Prussian field marshal (d. 1757)
1685 – Domenico Scarlatti, Italian harpsichord player and composer (d. 1757)
1694 – Johan Helmich Roman, Swedish composer and academic (d. 1758)
1747 – Ivan Mane Jarnović, Italian violinist and composer (d. 1804)
1757 – Karl Leonhard Reinhold, Austrian philosopher and academic (d. 1823)
1759 – Georges Danton, French lawyer and politician, French Minister of Justice (d. 1794)
1768 – Eustachy Erazm Sanguszko, Polish general and politician (d. 1844)
1794 – Konstantin Thon, Russian architect, designed the Grand Kremlin Palace and the Cathedral of Christ the Saviour (d. 1881)
1795 – Nikolaos Mantzaros, Greek composer and theorist (d. 1872)
1797 – Giuditta Pasta, Italian soprano (d. 1865)
1799 – Margaret Agnes Bunn, Scottish actress (d. 1883)
1800 – Helmuth von Moltke the Elder, Prussian field marshal (d. 1891)
1802 – Miguel I of Portugal (d. 1866)
1803 – Joseph Hansom, English architect and publisher, designed Birmingham Town Hall (d. 1882)
1842 – Vasily Vereshchagin, Russian soldier and painter (d. 1904)
1849 – Ferdinand Georg Frobenius, German mathematician and academic (d. 1917)
1850 – Grigore Tocilescu, Romanian archaeologist and historian (d. 1909)
1854 – C. W. Post, American businessman, founded Post Foods (d. 1914)
1860 – Frank Eaton, American marshal and author (d. 1958)
1865 – Benjamin Guggenheim, American businessman (d. 1912)
1869 – Washington Luís, Brazilian lawyer and politician, 13th President of Brazil (d. 1957)
1871 – Guillermo Kahlo, German-Mexican photographer (d. 1941)
1873 – A. K. Fazlul Huq, Bangladeshi-Pakistani lawyer and politician, 5th Pakistani Minister of Interior (d. 1962)
  1873   – Thorvald Stauning, Danish union leader and politician, 24th Prime Minister of Denmark (d. 1942)
1874 – Martin Lowry, English chemist and academic (d. 1936)
  1874   – Abby Aldrich Rockefeller, American philanthropist, founded the Museum of Modern Art (d. 1948)
1876 – H.B. Warner, English actor (d. 1958)
1878 – William Kissam Vanderbilt II, American motor racing enthusiast and yachtsman (d. 1944)
1880 – Andrei Bely, Russian novelist, poet, and critic (d. 1934)
1881 – Louis Bastien, French cyclist and fencer (d. 1963)
1883 – Napoleon Hill, American philosopher and author (d. 1970)
  1883   – Paul Pilgrim, American runner (d. 1958)
1884 – William Hogenson, American sprinter (d. 1965)
1888 – Runar Schildt, Finnish author (d. 1925)
1890 – Ganesh Shankar Vidyarthi, Indian journalist and politician (d. 1931)
1893 – Miloš Crnjanski, Serbian poet and author (d. 1977)
1894 – Florence Nagle, English trainer and breeder of racehorses (d. 1988)
1899 – Judy Johnson, American baseball player and coach (d. 1989)
1900 – Ibrahim Abboud, Sudanese politician and general, 1st President of Sudan (d. 1983)
  1900   – Karin Boye, Swedish poet and novelist (d. 1941)

1901–present
1902 – Beryl Markham, Kenyan horse trainer and author (d. 1986)
  1902   – Jack Sharkey, American boxer and referee (d. 1994)
  1902   – Henrietta Hill Swope, American astronomer and academic (d. 1980)
1903 – Mahn Ba Khaing, Burmese politician (d. 1947)
1905 – George Bernard Flahiff, Canadian cardinal (d. 1989)
1906 – Primo Carnera, Italian boxer and actor (d. 1967)
1909 – Ignace Lepp, French psychologist and author (d. 1966)
  1909   – Dante Quinterno, Argentinian author and illustrator (d. 2003)
1910 – John Krol, American cardinal (d. 1996)
1911 – Sid Gillman, American football player and coach (d. 2003)
  1911   – Mahalia Jackson, American singer (d. 1972)
  1911   – Sorley MacLean, Scottish poet and educator (d. 1996)
1912 – Don Siegel, American director and producer (d. 1991)
1913 – Charlie Barnet, American saxophonist, composer, and bandleader (d. 1991)
1914 – Jackie Coogan, American actor and director (d. 1984)
1915 – Ray Crawford, American race car driver, fighter ace, test pilot, and businessman (d. 1996)
  1915   – Joe Fry, English race car driver (d. 1950)
1916 – François Mitterrand, French lawyer and politician, 21st President of France (d. 1996)
  1916   – Boyd Wagner, American colonel and pilot (d. 1942)
1919 – Princess Ashraf of Iran (d. 2016)
  1919   – Frank Bourgholtzer, American journalist (d. 2010)
  1919   – Edward Brooke, American captain and politician, 47th Massachusetts Attorney General (d. 2015)
  1919   – Mohammad Reza Pahlavi, Shah of Iran (d. 1980)
1920 – Sarah Lee Lippincott, American astronomer and academic (d. 2019)
1921 – Joe Fulks, American basketball player (d. 1976)
1922 – Madelyn Dunham, American grandmother of Barack Obama (d. 2008)
  1922   – Fred Wood, English actor (d. 2003)
1923 – Robert Hinde, English zoologist and academic (d. 2016)
1924 – Shaw Taylor, English actor and television host (d. 2015)
1925 – Jan Wolkers, Dutch sculptor, painter, and author (d. 2007)
1926 – Panos Gavalas, Greek singer (d. 1988)
1927 – Warne Marsh, American saxophonist (d. 1987)
1928 – Francisco Solano López, Argentinian illustrator (d. 2011)
1929 – Neal Matthews Jr., American country/gospel singer (d. 2000)
1931 – Suhaila Noah, Spouse of the Prime Minister of Malaysia (d. 2014)
1933 – Takis Kanellopoulos, Greek director, producer, and screenwriter (d. 1990)
  1933   – Andrew P. O'Rourke, American judge and politician (d. 2013)
1934 – Hot Rod Hundley, American basketball player and sportscaster (d. 2015)
  1934   – Hans-Joachim Roedelius, German keyboard player and producer 
1935 – Mike Gray, American director, producer, and screenwriter (d. 2013)
  1935   – Gloria Conyers Hewitt, American mathematician and academic
1936 – Al Casey, American guitarist (d. 2006)
  1936   – Shelley Morrison, American actress (d. 2019)
  1936   – György Pauk, Hungarian violinist and educator
  1936   – Etelka Kenéz Heka, Hungarian writer, poet and singer
1940 – Eddie Henderson, American trumpet player and educator
  1940   – John Horgan, Irish academic and politician
1941 – Steven Kellogg, American author and illustrator
  1941   – Charlie Landsborough, English singer-songwriter and guitarist
1942 – Bob Hoskins, English actor, singer, and director (d. 2014)
  1942   – Milton Nascimento, Brazilian singer-songwriter and guitarist 
  1942   – Zdenko Runjić, Croatian songwriter and producer (d. 2004)
  1942   – Jonathan Williams, English race car driver and pilot (d. 2014)
1944 – Jim McCann, Irish singer and guitarist (d. 2015)
1945 – Pat Conroy, American author (d. 2016)
  1945   – Demetris Th. Gotsis, Greek poet and author
  1945   – Nancy Davis Griffeth, American computer scientist and academic
  1945   – Jaclyn Smith, American actress and producer
1946 – Kevin Barron, English electrician and politician
  1946   – Keith Hopwood, English singer-songwriter, guitarist, and producer 
  1946   – Pat Sajak, American journalist, actor, and game show host 
  1946   – Holly Woodlawn, Puerto Rican actress and author (d. 2015)
1947 – Ricardo Asch, Argentinian gynecologist and endocrinologist
  1947   – Ian Ashley, German-English race car driver
  1947   – Hillary Clinton, American lawyer and politician, 67th United States Secretary of State and 44th First Lady of the United States
  1947   – Reg Empey, Northern Irish businessman and politician, Lord Mayor of Belfast
  1947   – Trevor Joyce, Irish poet and scholar
  1947   – Kenzo Kitakata, Japanese author
1948 – Toby Harrah, American baseball player and coach
1949 – Antonio Carpio, Filipino lawyer and jurist, Senior Associate Justice of the Supreme Court of the Philippines
  1949   – Steve Rogers, American baseball player
  1949   – Kevin Sullivan, American wrestler and booker
1951 – Bootsy Collins, American singer-songwriter and bass player 
  1951   – Tommy Mars, American keyboard player
  1951   – Julian Schnabel, American painter, director, and screenwriter
1952 – Bobby Bandiera, American singer-songwriter and guitarist 
  1952   – Edward Garnier, English lawyer and politician, Solicitor General for England and Wales
  1952   – Andrew Motion, English poet and author
  1952   – David Was, American singer-songwriter and producer 
1953 – Roger Allam, British actor
  1953   – Tim Hely Hutchinson, English publisher
  1953   – Joe Meriweather, American basketball player and coach (d. 2013)
  1953   – Keith Strickland, American guitarist and songwriter 
1954 – Vasilis Hatzipanagis, Greek footballer
  1954   – Adam Mars-Jones, English author and critic
  1954   – James Pickens Jr., American actor
  1954   – D. W. Moffett, American actor and director
1956 – Stephen Gumley, Australian engineer and businessman
  1956   – Rita Wilson, American actress and producer
1957 – Bob Golic, American football player and radio host
1958 – Shaun Woodward, English journalist and politician, Secretary of State for Northern Ireland
1959 – Paul Farmer, American anthropologist and physician
  1959   – Evo Morales, Bolivian soldier and politician, 80th President of Bolivia
1961 – Gerald Malloy, American lawyer and politician
  1961   – Dylan McDermott, American actor
  1961   – Joey Salceda, Filipino politician
  1961   – Uhuru Kenyatta, Kenyan President 
1962 – Cary Elwes, English actor and producer
  1962   – Jack Morelli, American comic book professional and author
1963 – Tom Cavanagh, Canadian actor and producer
  1963   – Ted Demme, American actor, director, and producer (d. 2002)
  1963   – Natalie Merchant, American singer-songwriter and pianist 
1964 – Kikka Sirén, Finnish pop/schlager singer (d. 2005)
1965 – Kelly Rowan, Canadian actress and producer
  1965   – Ken Rutherford, New Zealand cricketer
1966 – Sverre Gjørvad, Norwegian drummer and composer 
  1966   – Masaharu Iwata, Japanese keyboard player and composer
  1966   – Jeanne Zelasko, American journalist and sportscaster
1967 – Douglas Alexander, Scottish lawyer and politician, former Minister of State for Europe
  1967   – Keith Urban, Australian-American singer-songwriter and guitarist
1968 – Miyuki Imori, Japanese actress and singer
1970 – Dian Bachar, American actor, director, and screenwriter
  1970   – Lisa Ryder, Canadian actress
1971 – Jim Butcher, American author
  1971   – Audley Harrison, English boxer
  1971   – Ronnie Irani, English cricketer
  1971   – Anthony Rapp, American actor and singer
1972 – Matsuko Deluxe, Japanese journalist and author
  1972   – Daniel Elena, Monegasque race car driver
1973 – Austin Healey, English rugby player and sportscaster
  1973   – Seth MacFarlane, American voice actor, singer, director, producer, and screenwriter
  1973   – Taka Michinoku, Japanese wrestler and trainer
1974 – Raveena Tandon, Indian actress, producer, and former model
1977 – Jon Heder, American actor and producer
  1977   – Marisha Pessl, American author
1978 – Sari Abacha, Nigerian footballer (d. 2013)
  1978   – Jimmy Aggrey, English footballer and actor
  1978   – Eva Kaili, Greek journalist and politician
  1978   – CM Punk, American wrestler, mixed martial artist, and actor
  1978   – Dave Zastudil, American football player
1979 – Movsar Barayev, Chechen terrorist (d. 2002)
1980 – Cristian Chivu, Romanian footballer
  1980   – Claire Cooper, English actress
  1980   – Koichi Watanabe, Japanese kick-boxer
1981 – Sam Brown, American actor, producer, and screenwriter
  1981   – Martina Schild, Swiss skier
  1981   – Guy Sebastian, Malaysian-Australian singer-songwriter
  1981   – Chou Ssu-Chi, Taiwanese baseball player
1982 – Nicola Adams, English boxer
  1982   – Adam Carroll, Irish race car driver
1983 – Francisco Liriano, Dominican baseball player
  1983   – Dmitri Sychev, Russian footballer
  1983   – Luke Watson, South African rugby player
1984 – Sasha Cohen, American figure skater
  1984   – Adriano Correia, Brazilian footballer
  1984   – Mathieu Crépel, French snowboarder
  1984   – Jefferson Farfán, Peruvian footballer
  1984   – Amanda Overmyer, American singer-songwriter
1985 – Andrea Bargnani, Italian basketball player
  1985   – Kafoumba Coulibaly, Ivorian footballer
  1985   – Monta Ellis, American basketball player
  1985   – Kieran Read, New Zealand rugby player
1986 – Ibor Bakar, French footballer
  1986   – Jakub Rzeźniczak, Polish footballer
  1986   – Marco Ruben, Argentinian footballer
  1986   – Schoolboy Q, German-American rapper 
1987 – Abudramae Bamba, Ivorian footballer
  1987   – Shawn Lauvao, American football player
1988 – Greg Zuerlein, American figure skater
  1988   – Nosliw Rodríguez, Venezuelan politician
1989 – Dre Kirkpatrick, American football player
  1989   – Emil Sayfutdinov, Russian motorcycle racer
1990 – Mark Swanepoel, South African rugby player
1991 – Riho Iida, Japanese model and actress
1992 – Joseph Cramarossa, Canadian hockey player
1994 – Waqa Blake, Fijian rugby league player
  1994   – Allie DeBerry, American model and actress
1996 – Rebecca Tunney, English gymnast
2002 – Julian Dennison, New Zealand actor
  2002   – Lee Eunsang, South Korean singer

Deaths

Pre-1600
 664 – Cedd, English monk and bishop (b. 620)
 760 – Cuthbert, archbishop of Canterbury
 899 – Alfred the Great, English king (b. 849)
 930 – Li Qi, chancellor of Later Liang (b. 871)
1111 – Gómez González, Castilian nobleman and military leader
1440 – Gilles de Rais, French knight (b. 1404)
1555 – Olympia Fulvia Morata, Italian-German scholar and educator (b. 1526)
1580 – Anna of Austria, Queen of Spain (b. 1549)

1601–1900
1609 – Matsudaira Tadayori, Japanese samurai and daimyō (b. 1582)
1631 – Michael Maestlin, German astronomer and mathematician (b. 1550)
1633 – Horio Tadaharu, Japanese daimyō (b. 1596)
1671 – Sir John Gell, 1st Baronet, English politician (b. 1593)
1675 – William Sprague, English settler, co-founded Charlestown, Massachusetts (b. 1609)
1686 – John Egerton, 2nd Earl of Bridgewater, English captain and politician, Lord Lieutenant of Buckinghamshire (b. 1623)
1717 – Catherine Sedley, Countess of Dorchester (b. 1657)
1751 – Philip Doddridge, English minister and hymn-writer (b. 1702)
1764 – William Hogarth, English painter and engraver (b. 1697)
1773 – Amédée-François Frézier, French mathematician, engineer, and explorer (b. 1682)
1803 – Granville Leveson-Gower, 1st Marquess of Stafford, English politician, Lord President of the Council (b. 1721)
1806 – John Graves Simcoe, English general and politician, 1st Lieutenant Governor of Upper Canada (b. 1752)
1817 – Nikolaus Joseph von Jacquin, Dutch-Austrian chemist and botanist (b. 1727)
1864 – William T. Anderson, American captain (b. 1838)
1866 – John Kinder Labatt, Irish-Canadian brewer, founded the Labatt Brewing Company (b. 1803)
1871 – Robert Anderson (Civil War), American general (b. 1805)
1890 – Carlo Collodi, Italian journalist and author (b. 1826)
1896 – Paul-Armand Challemel-Lacour, French philosopher, academic, and politician, French Minister of Foreign Affairs (b. 1827)

1901–present
1902 – Elizabeth Cady Stanton, American activist (b. 1815)
1909 – Itō Hirobumi, Japanese samurai and politician, Prime Minister of Japan (b. 1841)
1919 – Akashi Motojiro, Japanese general (b. 1864)
1927 – Jūkichi Yagi, Japanese poet (b. 1898)
1930 – Waldemar Haffkine, Russian-Swiss physician and microbiologist (b. 1860)
  1930   – Harry Payne Whitney, American businessman and horse breeder (b. 1872)
1931 – Charles Comiskey, American baseball player and manager (b. 1859)
1932 – Margaret Brown, American philanthropist and activist (b. 1867)
1937 – Józef Dowbor-Muśnicki, Polish general (b. 1867)
1941 – Arkady Gaidar, Russian journalist and author (b. 1904)
1943 – Aurel Stein, Hungarian-English archaeologist and academic (b. 1862)
1944 – Princess Beatrice of the United Kingdom (b. 1857)
  1944   – Hiroyoshi Nishizawa, Japanese lieutenant and pilot (b. 1920)
  1944   – William Temple, English archbishop and theologian (b. 1881)
1945 – Aleksey Krylov, Russian mathematician and engineer (b. 1863)
  1945   – Paul Pelliot, French sinologist and explorer (b. 1878)
1946 – Ioannis Rallis, Greek lawyer and politician, Prime Minister of Greece (b. 1878)
1947 – Edwin Savage, English priest and author (b. 1862)
1949 – Lionel Halsey, English admiral and courtier (b. 1872)
1952 – Hattie McDaniel, American actress and singer (b. 1895)
1956 – Walter Gieseking, French-German pianist and composer (b. 1895)
1957 – Gerty Cori, Czech-American biochemist and physiologist, Nobel Prize laureate (b. 1896)
  1957   – Nikos Kazantzakis, Greek philosopher, author, and playwright (b. 1883)
1960 – Toshizō Nishio, Japanese general (b. 1881)
1961 – Sadae Inoue, Japanese general (b. 1886)
1962 – Louise Beavers, American actress (b. 1902)
1963 – Elizabeth Gunn, New Zealand pediatrician (b. 1879)
1965 – Sylvia Likens, American murder victim (b. 1949)
1966 – Alma Cogan, English singer (b. 1932)
1972 – Igor Sikorsky, Ukrainian-American engineer and academic, founded Sikorsky Aircraft (b. 1889)
1973 – Semyon Budyonny, Marshal of the Soviet Union (b. 1883)
1974 – Bidia Dandaron, Russian author and educator (b. 1914)
1976 – Deryck Cooke, English musicologist and author (b. 1919)
1978 – Alexander Gerschenkron, Ukrainian-American historian, critic, and academic (b. 1904)
1979 – Park Chung-hee, South Korean general and politician, 3rd President of South Korea (b. 1917)
1984 – Gus Mancuso, American baseball player and coach (b. 1905)
1986 – Jackson Scholz, American runner (b. 1897)
1989 – Charles J. Pedersen, American chemist and academic, Nobel Prize laureate (b. 1904)
1991 – Sherry Hawco, Canadian gymnast (b. 1964)
1993 – Oro, Mexican wrestler (b. 1971)
1994 – Wilbert Harrison, American singer and guitarist (b. 1929)
1995 – Wilhelm Freddie, Danish painter and sculptor (b. 1909)
  1995   – Gorni Kramer, Italian bassist, songwriter, and bandleader (b. 1913)
1998 – Kenkichi Iwasawa, Japanese mathematician and academic (b. 1917)
1999 – Hoyt Axton, American singer-songwriter, guitarist, and actor (b. 1938)
  1999   – Eknath Easwaran, Indian-American author and educator (b. 1910)
2001 – Hüseyin Hilmi Işık, Turkish scholar and academic (b. 1911)
2002 – Jacques Massu, French general (b. 1908)
  2002   – Sally Hoyt Spofford, American ornithologist (b. 1914)
2004 – Bobby Ávila, Mexican baseball player and politician (b. 1924)
2005 – Keith Parkinson, American illustrator (b. 1958)
  2005   – George Swindin, English footballer and manager (b. 1914)
2006 – Tillman Franks, American bassist and songwriter (b. 1920)
  2006   – Pontus Hultén, Swedish art collector and curator (b. 1924)
2007 – Nicolae Dobrin, Romanian footballer and manager (b. 1947)
  2007   – Friedman Paul Erhardt, German-American chef and television host (b. 1943)
  2007   – Arthur Kornberg, American biochemist and academic, Nobel Prize (b. 1918)
2008 – Tony Hillerman, American journalist, author, and educator (b. 1925)
  2008   – Delmar Watson, American actor and photographer (b. 1926)
2009 – Teel Bivins, American lawyer and politician, 18th United States Ambassador to Sweden (b. 1947)
  2009   – Yoshirō Muraki, Japanese production designer and art director(b. 1924)
  2009   – George Naʻope, American singer and dancer (b. 1928)
  2009   – Troy Smith, American businessman, founded Sonic Drive-In (b. 1922)
2010 – Glen Little, American clown (b. 1925)
  2010   – Mbah Maridjan, Indonesian spiritual leader (b. 1927)
  2010   – Romeu Tuma, Brazilian police officer and politician (b. 1931)
2011 – Jona Senilagakali, Fijian physician and politician, 7th Prime Minister of Fiji (b. 1929)
2012 – Mac Ahlberg, Swedish-Italian director, screenwriter, and cinematographer (b. 1931)
  2012   – Arnold Greenberg, American businessman, co-founded Snapple (b. 1932)
  2012   – John M. Johansen American architect, designed the Morris A. Mechanic Theatre (b. 1916)
  2012   – Alan Kirschenbaum, American director, producer, and screenwriter (b. 1961)
  2012   – Björn Sieber, Austrian skier (b. 1989)
  2012   – Alan Stretton, Australian general (b. 1922)
2013 – Ritva Arvelo, Finnish actress, director, and screenwriter (b. 1921)
  2013   – Ron Davies, Welsh photographer (b. 1921)
  2013   – Doug Ireland, American journalist and activist (b. 1946)
  2013   – Al Johnson, American singer-songwriter and producer (b. 1948)
  2013   – Andries Maseko, South African footballer (b. 1955)
  2013   – Gabriel of Komana (b. 1946)
2014 – Vic Allen, English sociologist, economist, and historian (b. 1923)
  2014   – Jack Bruce, Scottish-English singer-songwriter and bass player (b. 1943)
  2014   – Mo Collins, American football player and coach (b. 1976)
  2014   – Germain Gagnon, Canadian ice hockey player (b. 1942)
  2014   – Senzo Meyiwa, South African footballer (b. 1987)
  2014   – Brian Moore, Australian rugby league player  (b. 1944)
  2014   – Jeff Robinson, American baseball player (b. 1961)
  2014   – Gordy Soltau, American football player and sportscaster (b. 1925)
  2014   – Oscar Taveras, Dominican baseball player (b. 1992)
2015 – Willis Carto, American activist and theorist (b. 1926) 
  2015   – Leo Kadanoff, American physicist and academic (b. 1937)
  2015   – Giuseppe Nazzaro, Italian-Syrian bishop and theologian (b. 1937)
2017 – Ali Ashraf Darvishian, Iranian novelist, short story writer and academic. (b. 1941)
2021 – Roh Tae-woo, South Korean general and politician, 6th President of South Korea (b. 1932)

Holidays and observances
Accession Day (Jammu and Kashmir, India)
Angam Day (Nauru)
Armed Forces Day (Benin)
Christian feast day:
Alfred the Great (Catholic Church, Anglican Church, Eastern Orthodox Church)
Amandus of Strasbourg
Beóán (Bean) of Mortlach
Blessed Celine Borzecka
Cedd
Cuthbert of Canterbury
Demetrius of Thessaloniki
Eadfrith of Leominster
Eata of Hexham
Pope Evaristus (Aristus)
Fulk of Pavia (Roman Catholic Church)
Philipp Nicolai, Johann Heermann and Paul Gerhardt (Lutheran Church)
Quadragesimus
Quodvultdeus
Rusticus of Narbonne
Witta (Albinus) of Büraburg
Eastern Orthodox liturgics
National Day, celebrates the anniversary of the Declaration of Neutrality in 1955. (Austria)
Intersex Awareness Day

References

External links

 
 
 

Days of the year
October